The Men's 77 kg weightlifting competitions at the 2016 Summer Olympics in Rio de Janeiro took place on 10 August at the Pavilion 2 of Riocentro. Nijat Rahimov originally won the gold medal but was disqualified in March 2022 by the Court of Arbitration for Sport for a doping violation (urine substitutions in the weeks before the Games). As of March 2022, medals for this event have not been reallocated, a process that could extend to 2024. If the medal is reallocated, Lü Xiaojun stands to win his third Olympic weightlifting gold medal.

Schedule
All times are Time in Brazil (UTC-03:00)

Records
Prior to this competition, the existing world and Olympic records were as follows.

Results

1 This medal distribution is speculative pending a possible IOC reallocation process.
2 Rahimov originally won the gold medal but was disqualified in March 2022 by the Court of Arbitration for Sport after a doping violation. As yet, medals for this event have not been reallocated.

New records

References

Weightlifting at the 2016 Summer Olympics
Men's events at the 2016 Summer Olympics